The Pride of Jesse Hallam is a 1981 American made-for-television drama film starring Johnny Cash and Brenda Vaccaro. It originally aired March 3, 1981 on CBS.

Plot
Jesse Hallam is a coal miner in Muhlenberg, Kentucky, whose wife has recently died and who has also recently lost his job. His daughter Jenny is in need of an operation on her back, and the nearest hospital that can successfully perform the procedure is in Cincinnati, Ohio. He sells the family farm to his brother-in-law Charlie, receives $15,000 in cash, packs up Jenny and his son Ted, and piles their belongings on a pickup truck as they head to Cincinnati to start a new life.

Upon arrival in Cincinnati, Jesse checks Jenny into the hospital, paying the $14,000 for her operation. After getting Ted registered at Harding High School, Jesse sets out to find work. However, as he is presented with a job application to fill out, he backs off and leaves. His efforts seem futile until he witnesses a vendor trying to cheat an elderly fruit grocer by selling him inferior apples. Jesse intervenes and stops it. The grocer, an Italian immigrant named Sal Galucci (Eli Wallach), offers Jesse a job immediately.

Soon afterwards, Jesse learns his driver's license has expired after he runs a stop sign and is stopped by a police officer.  One day, as Jesse is helping Sal set up a stand at a farmer's market, Sal rebukes him for setting their wares on a spot marked with another name. Sal then realizes that Jesse is illiterate. He convinces Jesse to allow Sal to have his daughter Marian, who is also Ted's principal, teach him.

Meanwhile, Ted is struggling academically, especially with reading. Because of this, he also struggles socially, leading him to hang out with a group of wild friends from school. This culminates in a police officer bringing Ted home to Jesse after Ted consumes alcohol.

Jesse continues to progress well with his reading, to the point where Marian offers him a copy of Ernest Hemingway's "The Old Man and the Sea", which further inspires Jesse.  She suggests a summer reading program at the high school that would bring him to a higher grade level.  However, after Jesse fails the written portion of his driver's test, he becomes discouraged and decides to return to Kentucky, which pleases Ted.

After the school year ends, Ted brings home his report card, and when probed by Jesse, Ted says he received an A in gym and a D in math. Jesse learns that Ted flunked out of school...failing all of his other subjects, which require him to know how to read.

The final scene shows Jesse and Ted showing up at the high school for the remedial reading class that Marian had suggested to Jesse earlier. The teacher calls roll, with Jesse and Ted proudly stating 'here' when their names are called.

Production notes
 This movie was filmed entirely on location in Cincinnati, Ohio and rural Kentucky.
 The 1987 made-for-television film Bluffing It, which starred Dennis Weaver, also dealt with adult illiteracy, which was Jesse Hallam's main problem.

References

External links

1981 television films
1981 films
1981 drama films
American drama television films
CBS network films
Films set in Cincinnati
Films directed by Gary Nelson
1980s American films
1980s English-language films